Reldia is a genus of plants in the family Gesneriaceae. They are also in the Beslerieae tribe.

They are native to Colombia, Costa Rica, Ecuador, Panamá and Peru in South America.

It contains the following species, according to Plants of the World Online;
 Reldia alternifolia Wiehler
 Reldia calcarata L.P.Kvist & L.E.Skog
 Reldia grandiflora L.P. Kvist & L.E. Skog
 Reldia longipedunculata J.L.Clark
 Reldia minutiflora (L.E. Skog) L.P. Kvist & L.E. Skog
 Reldia multiflora L.P.Kvist & L.E.Skog

The genus name of Reldia is in honour of Robert Louis Dressler (b. 1927), an American botanist specialist of the taxonomy of the Orchidaceae family. It was first described and published in Selbyana Vol.2 on page 124 in 1977.

The genus is recognized by the United States Department of Agriculture and the Agricultural Research Service, but they do not list any known species.

References

 
Taxonomy articles created by Polbot
Gesneriaceae genera
Plants described in 1977
Flora of Costa Rica
Flora of Panama
Flora of western South America